George Gregory Pease (June 18, 1903 – October 26, 1984) was a professional football player with the New York Yankees of the first American Football League and the Orange Tornadoes of the National Football League (NFL). George  played college football at Columbia University prior to playing professionally.

References

External links
 

1903 births
1984 deaths
American football halfbacks
American football quarterbacks
Columbia Lions football players
New York Yankees (AFL) players
Orange Tornadoes players
Sportspeople from Brooklyn
Players of American football from New York City